The 2008 British Speedway Championship was the 48th edition of the British Speedway Championship. The Final took place on 29 May at the Abbey Stadium in Swindon, England. The Championship was won by Scott Nicholls, who beat Edward Kennett, Tai Woffinden and Chris Harris in the final heat.

Final 
29 May 2008
 Abbey Stadium, Swindon

{| width=100%
|width=50% valign=top|

Qualifying

Semi-final

Final

See also 
 British Speedway Championship

References 

British Speedway Championship
Great Britain
British Speedway